Tourism in Japan is a major industry and contributor to the Japanese economy.

As of 2019, Japan attracted 31.88 million international tourists. Japan has 21 World Heritage Sites, including Himeji Castle, Historic Monuments of Ancient Kyoto and Nara.  Popular foreigner attractions include Tokyo and Hiroshima, Mount Fuji, ski resorts such as Niseko in Hokkaido, Okinawa, riding the shinkansen and taking advantage of Japan's hotel and hotspring network.

The 2017 Travel and Tourism Competitiveness Report ranked Japan 4th out of 141 countries overall, which was the highest in Asia. Japan gained relatively high scores in almost all of the featured aspects, such as health and hygiene, safety and security, cultural resources and business travel.

History 

The origins of early traditions of visits to picturesque sites are unclear, but an early sight-seeing excursion was Matsuo Bashō's 1689 trip to the then "far north" of Japan, which occurred not long after Hayashi Razan categorized the Three Views of Japan in 1643.  During the Edo era of Japan, from around 1600 to the Meiji Restoration in 1867, travel was regulated within the country through the use of shukuba or post stations, towns where travelers had to present appropriate documentation. Despite these restrictions, porter stations and horse stables, as well as places for lodging and food were available on well-traveled routes. During this time, Japan was a closed country to foreigners, so no foreign tourism existed in Japan.

Following the Meiji Restoration and the building of a national railroad network, tourism became more of an affordable prospect for domestic citizens and visitors from foreign countries could enter Japan legally. Its early leaders included Shibusawa Eiichi and Ekida Takashi. Another major milestone in the development of the tourism industry in Japan was the 1907 passage of the Hotel Development Law, as a result of which the Railways Ministry began to construct publicly owned hotels throughout Japan.

For much of post-World War II history, Japan has been an exceptionally unattractive tourist destination for its population and GDP size; from 1995 to 2014, it was by far the least visited country in the G7 despite being the second largest country in the group, and as of 2013 was one of the least visited countries in the OECD on a per capita basis.

Statistics 

In 2018, 31,191,856 foreign tourists visited Japan.

Current status 
Domestic tourism remains a vital part of the Japanese economy and Japanese culture. Children in many middle schools see the highlight of their years as a visit to Tokyo Disneyland or perhaps Tokyo Tower, and many high school students often visit Okinawa or Hokkaido. The extensive rail network together with domestic flights sometimes in planes with modifications to favor the relatively short distances involved in intra-Japan travel allows efficient and speedy transport. International tourism plays a smaller role in the Japanese economy compared to other developed countries; in 2013, international tourist receipts was 0.3% of Japan's GDP, while the corresponding figure was 1.3% for the United States and 2.3% for France.

In inbound tourism, Japan was ranked 28th in the world in 2007 when the country had the 2nd largest GDP. In 2009, the Yomiuri Shimbun published a modern list of famous sights under the name Heisei Hyakkei (the Hundred Views of the Heisei period).

Tourists from South Korea have made up the largest number of inbound tourists several times in the past. In 2010, their 2.4 million arrivals made up 27% of the tourists visiting Japan.

Travelers from China have been the highest spenders in Japan by country, spending an estimated 196.4 billion yen (US$2.4 billion) in 2011, or almost a quarter of total expenditure by foreign visitors, according to data from the Japan Tourism Agency.

According to the Japan National Tourism Organization in 2017, 3 out of 4 foreign tourists came from other parts of East Asia, namely South Korea, Mainland China, Taiwan and Hong Kong.

Japanese video games, manga and anime play a role in driving tourism to Japan. In surveys held by Statista between 2019 and 2020, 24.2% of tourists from the United States, 7.7% of tourists from China and 6.1% of tourists from South Korea said they were motivated to visit Japan because of Japanese popular culture.

The Japanese government hoped to receive 40 million foreign tourists every year by 2020, however, due to the COVID-19 pandemic, the country received only 4.12 million foreign tourists in 2020.

In September 2022, the Japanese government announced that visa requirements from some countries will be waived from October 2022, in a move to reopen travel after the COVID-19 pandemic border restrictions. Prior to the pandemic, Japan did not require tourist visas for 68 countries and regions.

Effect of the Fukushima nuclear disaster (2011) 
Following the triple meltdown of the nuclear reactors in Fukushima, caused by the earthquake and tsunami, the number of foreign visitors in Japan were declined for months. However, in September 2011, some 539,000 foreign people visited Japan, this was 25 percent down compared with the same month in 2010. This decline was largely attributed to the Fukushima nuclear accident and the stronger yen made a visit to Japan more expensive.

To boost tourism the Japanese Tourism Agency announced in October 2011 a plan to give 10,000 round-trip air tickets to Japan to encourage visitors to come. In 2012, free tickets would be offered if the winners would write online about their experiences in Japan. They also would need to answer some questions about how they felt while visiting Japan after the triple disaster and how the interest in tourism in Japan could be renewed. About US$15 million would be spent on this program.
On December 26, 2011, The Japan Tourism Agency reported on their site that the "Fly to Japan! Project", which would have given out 10,000 round-trip tickets to Japan, was not approved by the government for fiscal year 2012.

By 2012, international tourism in Japan had inflows had recovered to pre-2011 levels.

Major tourist destinations

Hokkaido 
 Niseko Ski Resort
 Shiretoko Peninsula (WHS)
 Teshikaga – Lake Mashū, Lake Kussharo
 Tōya Caldera and Mount Usu Geopark
 Daisetsuzan Volcanic Group
 Hakodate
 Otaru

Tōhoku region 
 Shirakami-Sanchi (WHS)
 Mount Osore
 Lake Towada
 Hirosaki – Hirosaki Castle, Nakacho Samurai District
 Hiraizumi – Chūson-ji, Mōtsū-ji, Kanjizaiō-in, Takkoku-no-Iwaya
 Semboku – Kakunodate Samurai District, Lake Tazawa, Nyūtō Onsen
 Yamagata – Yama-dera Temple, Zaō Onsen
 Matsushima

Kantō region 
 Nikkō – Shrines and Temples of Nikkō (WHS), Kegon Falls, Lake Chūzenji, Cedar Avenue of Nikko
 Tomioka Silk Mill (WHS)
 Kinugawa Onsen – Edo Wonderland Nikko Edomura, Tobu World Square
 Utsunomiya – Oya stone museum, Utsunomiya Futarayama Shrine
 Ashikaga, Tochigi – Ashikaga Gakkō, Ashikaga Flower Park
 Tokyo – Imperial Palace, Asakusa, Akihabara, Ginza, Harajuku/Omotesandō, Nakano Broadway, Shibuya, Shinjuku, Tsukiji Fish Market, Ueno Park
 Tokyo Disney Resort
 Kamakura – Tsurugaoka Hachiman-gū, Kōtoku-in, Kenchō-ji, Engaku-ji, Meigetsu-in, Hase-dera
 Kusatsu Onsen
 Hakone Onsen

Chūbu region 
 Mount Fuji
 Japanese Alps – Tateyama Kurobe Alpine Route(Mount Tate), Hida Mountains, Kiso Mountains, Akaishi Mountains
 Kurobe Gorge Railway
 Shiga Kōgen
 Matsumoto – Matsumoto Castle, Mount Hotaka, Kamikōchi
 Shirakawa-gō and Gokayama (WHS)
 Takayama – Sanmachi Traditional Street, Ōshinmachi Traditional Street, Higashiyama Temple Area
 Kanazawa – Kenroku-en Garden, Kanazawa Castle, Higashi Geisha District, Nagamachi Samurai District
 Sakai – Tōjinbō, Maruoka Castle
 Nagoya – Nagoya Castle, Atsuta Shrine, Sakae, Nagoya Station (Meieki), Ōsu Kannon temple

Kansai region 
 Kyoto – Kinkaku-ji, Ginkaku-ji, Kiyomizu-dera, Ryōan-ji, Sanjūsangen-dō, etc., they are parts of Historic Monuments of Ancient Kyoto (WHS)
 Uji – Byōdō-in and Ujigami Shrine (WHS), Relation of The Tale of Genji
 Ōtsu – Lake Biwa, Hiyoshi Taisha, Sakamoto Temple District, Mount Hiei, Enryaku-ji (WHS)
 Ōmihachiman – Traditional Riverside District
 Nara – Tōdai-ji, Tōshōdai-ji, Kōfuku-ji, Yakushi-ji, Heijō Palace, Kasuga-taisha and Nara Park, etc. They are parts of the Historic Monuments of Ancient Nara (WHS).
 Ikaruga – Hōryū-ji and Hōki-ji are Buddhist Monuments in the Hōryū-ji Area (WHS).
 Yoshino (Mount Yoshino) – Kimpusen-ji, Yoshimizu Shrine, Yoshino Mikumari Shrine, etc. They are parts of the Sacred Sites and Pilgrimage Routes in the Kii Mountain Range (WHS).
 Shingū – Kumano Hayatama Taisha and Kumano River (WHS)
 Nachikatsuura – Nachi Falls, Kumano Kodō, etc., they are parts of Sacred Sites and Pilgrimage Routes in the Kii Mountain Range (WHS)
 Mount Kōya – Kongōbu-ji (WHS)
 Osaka – Osaka Castle, Umeda, Namba, Dōtonbori, Shinsaibashi, Shinsekai, Shitennō-ji, Sumiyoshi-taisha, Universal Studios Japan, Kaiyukan, Rinku Town, Den-Den Town, Expo Commemoration Park, Kamagasaki
 Himeji – Engyō-ji, Koko-en Garden, and Himeji Castle (WHS)
 Kobe – Port of Kobe, Rokkō Mountains, Kitano-chō, Arima Onsen, Kobe Luminarie
 San'in Kaigan Geopark – Toyooka, Izushi, Kinosaki Onsen, Yumura Onsen

Chūgoku region 
 Hiroshima Prefecture – Atomic Bomb Dome (WHS), Itsukushima Shrine (WHS), Onomichi, Tomonoura
 Okayama Prefecture – Kurashiki, Kōrakuen Garden, Okayama Castle
 Tottori Prefecture – Tottori Sand Dunes, Mount Daisen, Mount Hyōno, San'in Kaigan Geopark
 Shimane Prefecture – Iwami Ginzan Silver Mine (WHS), Izumo-taisha, Matsue Castle, Oki Islands, Tsuwano
 Yamaguchi Prefecture – Hagi

Shikoku 
 Shikoku Pilgrimage (Zentsū-ji, Motoyama-ji, etc.)
 Ehime Prefecture – Dōgo Onsen, Matsuyama Castle
 Kagawa Prefecture – Kotohira-gū Shrine, Ritsurin Garden, Shōdo Island, Naoshima Island
 Tokushima Prefecture – Naruto whirlpools, Awa Dance Festival in Tokushima
 Kōchi Prefecture – Kōchi Castle, Cape Muroto (Muroto Geopark), Cape Ashizuri

Kyushu and Okinawa 
 Fukuoka Prefecture – Mojiko Retro Town, Kokura Castle, Dazaifu Tenman-gū, Remains of Dazaifu (government)
 Ōita Prefecture – Many types of hot springs in Beppu, Ōita or Yufuin, Ōita, Usa jingū, stone bridges, small stonehenge on the top of Komekamiyama (mountain), Hello Kitty Harmonyland
 Nagasaki Prefecture – Ōura Church, Higashi-Yamate, Minami-Yamate including the Glover Garden, Huis Ten Bosch (theme park), Hidden Christian Sites (WHS)
 Kagoshima Prefecture – Yakushima (WHS), Sakurajima, Amami Ōshima
 Miyazaki Prefecture – Kirishima-Yaku National Park, Takachiho, Old Exculibur on the top of Takachiho-kyo mountain, Nichinan, Miyazaki,　Chambered barrows of Saitobaru kofungun, Heiwadai Park
 Kumamoto Prefecture – Kumamoto Castle,　Mount Aso
 Saga Prefecture –  Pre-400 BC Yayoi archaeological site in Yoshinogari site
 Okinawa Prefecture – Shuri Castle, Nakagusuku Castle, Nakijin Castle etc. They are parts of the Gusuku Sites and Related Properties of the Kingdom of Ryukyu. (WHS), Ishigaki Island, Miyako Island, Iriomote Island, Traditional Ryukyuan Houses in Taketomi Island

See also 
Visa policy of Japan
World Heritage Sites in Japan
National Treasures of Japan
List of museums in Japan
List of National Geoparks in Japan
List of Special Places of Scenic Beauty, Special Historic Sites and Special Natural Monuments
Groups of Traditional Buildings
Japanese museums
Ryokan (Japanese inn)

References 

Travel with Smile. Best Places to Travel in Japan

External links 

Japan National Tourist Organization

 JapanTourist Travel Articles Database
 2018 Foreign Visitors & Japanese Departures

 
Japan